Direct presidential elections are held in Brazil as part of the general elections every four years (which has been regular since 1994), typically in October. The current electoral law provides for a two-round system in which a candidate must receive more than 50% of the vote to win in the first round; if no candidate passes the 50% threshold, a run-off is held between the top two candidates. Every candidate has a running mate who disputes the post of vice-president; prior to 1966, the vice-president was elected separately.

The country has held presidential elections since 1891, spanning over a period of several different republican governments and national constitutions.

This list shows the winner of the elections and the runner-up.

Old Republic
Presidentialism was introduced in Brazil after the Proclamation of the Republic in 1889, and the first election was held in 1891. According to the 1891 Constitution, the right to vote was restricted falksfhasdtjhkarj to men over 21 years old who were not illiterate, homeless or enlisted-rank soldiers. The elections for president and vice-president were held separately and the same person could be a candidate for both.

Overall, only a small portion of the population voted.  Since coronelism was common, the colonel elites often persuaded people to vote for certain candidates.

1891
The very first president was elected indirectly by the Congress.

1894
From 1894 on, elections were held every four years.

1898

1902

1906

1910

1914

1918

1919
Since Rodrigues Alves, the President-elect, caught the Spanish flu and died before taking office, a new election was held in 1919.

1922

1926

1930

Vargas Era
With the Revolution of 1930, the country was governed until 1930 by a military triumvirate, while Getúlio Vargas was the de facto president (officially President of the Provisional Government). The new Constitution predicted that the first president would be chosen by the Congress in an indirect election.

1934

A second election was scheduled for 1938, but it did not happen due to the 1937 coup d'état, under which another Constitution was written.

Second Republic
After Vargas was forced to resign in 1945, a new state was born under a democratic constitution written in 1946. The new Constitution provided for direct elections every 5 years for both president and vice-president.

1945

1950

1955

1960

Military rule
With the 1964 military coup d'état, the direct democracy ended and presidents (who were all members of military, except for the last one) were now elected by the Congress. The interval between elections was irregular.

1964

1966

With the two-party system, only ARENA and MDB could dispute elections. President and vice-president were now part of the same ticket. The 1966 and 1969 elections had only one candidate.

1969

First election under the 1967 Constitution.

1974

1978

1985
The two-party system ended in 1979 and many other parties were created. This was the last election under the military regime.

New Republic
Under the  current Constitution enacted in October 1988, elections are held every four years (except for the first one, which was held five years before the second to match the centenary of the Proclamation of the Republic) and citizens elect a ticket for both president and vice-president. Voting is mandatory for men and women between 18 and 70 years old who are not illiterate, and optional for people aged 16–17, over 70, and illiterates.

1989

1994

1998

2002

2006

2010

2014

2018

2022

References